Bloembergen is a Dutch surname. Notable people with the surname include:

Auke Bloembergen (1927–2016), Dutch jurist and legal scholar
Nicolaas Bloembergen (born 1920), Dutch-American physicist

See also
10447 Bloembergen, a main-belt asteroid

Dutch-language surnames